Provincetown Municipal Airport  is a public airport located at the end of Cape Cod, two miles (3 km) northwest of the central business district of Provincetown, in Barnstable County, Massachusetts, United States. This airport is operated by the Town of Provincetown on land leased from the United States National Park Service.

The airport is used for general aviation and by one commercial airline, Cape Air, which operates non-stop flights of 25 minutes duration to Boston's Logan International Airport. During the off-season, Cape Air operates three daily flights each way. On summer weekends, flights are scheduled approximately every 45 minutes in both directions. The airport recently added complimentary high-speed internet access for all passengers and crew members utilizing the facility. A limited amount of free parking is available for vehicles used by general and commercial aviation passengers. Aircraft parking is available from Cape Air, the fixed-base operator (FBO).

History
The airport was constructed in the 1940s and the runway was first paved in 1948. The original transitions to the taxiways were curved, or jug-handle-shaped to support tail-draggers like the DC-3 that operated at the airport in the 1940s and 1950s. 

In 1949, Provincetown-Boston Airlines started scheduled air service between Provincetown and Boston using Cessna Bobcats. Through a series of mergers, PBA was eventually acquired by People's Express and which later merged with Continental Airlines and in 1988, Continental cancelled the Provincetown - Boston route. Cape Air began operations that same year and continues to serve Provincetown today.  

The present terminal building is a single-story wooden structure and was constructed in 1998. The terminal provides Cape Air check-in and a waiting area, TSA screening areas, and a conference room.

Facilities and aircraft

For the 12-month period ending September 1, 2016, the airport averaged 136 operations per day: 85% transient general aviation, 8% commercial, 2% air taxi, 4% local general aviation and <1% military. There are 10 aircraft based at this airport: 8 single engine and 2 multi-engine.

Airline and destinations

Ground transportation
Taxis are often available in front of the airport terminal, but it is wise to make reservations if you are part of a group of 3 or more. Cell service is unreliable, but there is a free taxi call box located to the left of the front airport doors. The Town-regulated maximum rate per person into Provincetown is $18, including 2 suitcases per passenger. Rental cars are available at the airport in summer months only. In the summer months a shuttle bus service runs between the airport, race point beach and the town center, but does not serve guest houses or inns.

Taxis

 Atlantic Rides P-Town, 928 Commercial St. +1 508-413-3192, . Local, general taxi services. Airport transfers to any Cape Cod location.
 Black & White Taxi, 336 Commercial St. +1 508-413-5413, . Local, general taxi services. Airport transfers to any Cape Cod location.

Airport management
The Provincetown Airport is overseen by the Airport Commission, a five-person board appointed by the Provincetown Board of Selectmen.

References

External links
 

Airports in Barnstable County, Massachusetts
National Park Service
Provincetown, Massachusetts